Popular Unity is a Uruguayan electoral alliance of Left-wing and Socialist political parties.

Previously known as Popular Assembly, they were born out of dissatisfaction with the Broad Front since it became the party in charge of the government, accusing it of being "not leftist enough". In 2013 they changed to the current name. They took part in the 2014 Uruguayan general election, when they got their first representative at the Chamber of Deputies, who has been a vocal critic of the centre-left government.

Their candidate to the 2019 Uruguayan general election was once again Gonzalo Abella, with an anti-oligarchy and anti-imperialist platform.

Composition
Avanzar Movement
Bolshevik Party of Uruguay
Communist Refoundation

March 26 Movement
National Group ProUNIR
Popular Assembly
Retirement Defense Movement
Revolutionary Communist Party of Uruguay
Socialist Compromise
Socialist Intransigence
Workers' and Peasants' Party of Uruguay

Electoral history

Presidential elections

Chamber of Deputies and Senate elections

See also
Anti-imperialist Unitary Commissions
Broad Front

References

External links
Official website

2013 establishments in Uruguay
Political parties established in 2013
Political party alliances in Uruguay